Eurith Dickinson Rivers (December 1, 1895 – June 11, 1967), commonly known as E. D. Rivers and informally as "Ed" Rivers, was an American politician from Lanier County, Georgia. A Democrat, he was the 68th Governor of Georgia, serving from 1937 to 1941.

Early life and education
Eurith Dickinson Rivers was born on December 1, 1895, in Center Point, Arkansas. He attended Young Harris College in North Georgia and settled in Cairo in South Georgia. Rivers also obtained a law degree through La Salle Extension University. Rivers served as a Justice of the Peace, Cairo City Attorney, and Grady County Attorney. He later moved to another South Georgia community, Milltown (now called Lakeland), to become editor of the Lanier County News.

Career
Rivers was elected to the Georgia House of Representatives in 1924 and to the Georgia State Senate in 1926. During this time, he was a member of the Ku Klux Klan. In 1928 and 1930, Rivers was an unsuccessful candidate for the Democratic nomination for Governor. In 1932, he ran for the Georgia House of Representatives. He was elected Speaker of the Georgia House of Representatives, serving from 1933 to 1937.

In 1930, Rivers, a Great Titan of the Klan, spoke in front of a crowd in Clarke County, Georgia lamenting of an "alien invasion" attempting to "take away the freedom of government from the masses." The reference was made towards chain stores, which the Ku Klux Klan opposed.

His election as governor came after a stormy Democratic primary in 1936 in which the race served as a surrogate referendum on US President Franklin Roosevelt's New Deal. Since Georgia did not allow three consecutive terms, Governor Eugene Talmadge was not eligible for re-election. Talmadge, who strongly opposed the New Deal and had delayed its implementation in Georgia, ran for the US Senate and backed Charles D. Redwine for governor. Rivers, who, as Speaker, had strongly supported the New Deal, was his opponent and won with about 60 percent of the vote, the same margin by which Talmadge lost his Senate race.

Rivers' first two-year term as governor saw Georgia pass the legislation required to bring New Deal programs into the state, and was widely acclaimed. Rivers created the 7-month school year. Under Rivers' leadership, electrical services were expanded to rural areas of the state. Georgia moved from the lowest-ranked state to the top of the list in the number of rural electrification associations. When he was in office, the State Bureau of Unemployment Compensation was created, allowing Georgians to receive unemployment benefits.

Upon his election, Rivers named Ku Klux Klan Imperial Wizard Hiram Wesley Evans as a member of his staff.

When Arthur Perry and Arthur Mack, two black men, faced rushed death sentences by an all-white jury for alleged murder, attorney and future Supreme Court justice Thurgood Marshall requested Rivers to grant due process to the defendants. Rivers issued a cold reply: "Prison commission has no record of matter you mentioned in your wire of yesterday."

In 1938, rumors circulated that Franklin D. Roosevelt would endorse Rivers for United States Senate to oppose Walter F. George, who had opposed the president's Judicial Procedures Reform Bill of 1937, commonly known as the court-packing plan. Roosevelt's advisers warned him of Rivers' KKK connections, and the Georgia governor opted for re-election instead of seeking the Senate seat.

After Rivers' re-election in 1938, he ran into problems financing many of his improvement programs. Although the budget was reduced by 25 percent, he was able to convince the legislature to create the Georgia Housing Authority and obtain federal funds to build public housing. During Rivers' second term, there were political scandals and charges of corruption. Many of Rivers' appointees and staff members were charged with corrupt practices, and the charges reflected poorly on the governor.

In 1939, Rivers proclaimed a state holiday for the December premiere of the film Gone With the Wind.

Rivers sought the governorship again in 1946 but finished a distant third behind Eugene Talmadge and James V. Carmichael in the Democratic primary.

Later life and death
Rivers was never again elected to public office.  He became a successful radio station owner. His son Dee Rivers was the first ever radio owner to broadcast urban radio below the mason dixon line. Rivers retired to Dade County Florida after putting WEDR Radio on the air in Miami. He left behind son Dee, daughter Geraldine, wife Luciel, grand children Dicky, Jay, Jonie, Dee, Jan, Ed, Rex, Kells, Lucy and Georgia Rivers. He died in Atlanta, Georgia, in 1967 and is interned in a mausoleum in the City Cemetery in Lakeland, Georgia.

Rivers is the most recent Georgia governor to have been born outside the state.

Known as the poor man's Governor. Rivers campaign slogan was never again will the pots and the pans of the poor man, be sold at the courthouse steps.

Rivers to this day has never had an act of legislation overturned. Being a new dealer under Roosevelt,  his record stand as the governor who did the most for poor. Building Interstates, creating the highway patrol providing free school books for all race and poverty levels, as well as providing rides to all low-income and minority voters to the polls.

See also

List of governors of Georgia
List of speakers of the Georgia House of Representatives

References

External links

 

1895 births
1967 deaths
People from Howard County, Arkansas
Democratic Party governors of Georgia (U.S. state)
Democratic Party Georgia (U.S. state) state senators
Georgia (U.S. state) lawyers
American Ku Klux Klan members
Young Harris College alumni
La Salle Extension University alumni
People from Lanier County, Georgia
20th-century American politicians
Speakers of the Georgia House of Representatives
Democratic Party members of the Georgia House of Representatives
20th-century American lawyers
History of racism in Georgia (U.S. state)